Ariyalur taluk is a taluk of Ariyalur district of the Indian state of Tamil Nadu. The headquarters of the taluk is the town of Ariyalur.

Demographics
According to the 2011 census, the taluk of Ariyalur had a population of 255,749 with 126,931 males and 128,818 females. There were 1,015 women for every 1,000 men. The taluk had a literacy rate of 64.54%. Child population in the age group below 6 was 13,812 Males and 12,795 Females.

See also
Alanduraiyarkattalai
Ammbappur
Andipattakkadu
Sannavur (North)

References 

Taluks of Ariyalur district